Nelson Cruz Santiago (born August 12, 1975 in Ponce, Puerto Rico) is a Puerto Rican politician and a member of the Senate of Puerto Rico from 2017 to 2021. He is affiliated to the New Progressive Party (PNP).

Early years and studies
Born to Nelson Cruz Piña and Bethzaida Santiago Hernández. He has an associate degree in police science from the Criminal Investigation College of the Puerto Rico Police, and a Bachelor of Science in Social Sciences with a concentration in criminal justice of the Ana G. Méndez University System.

Professional career
In 1995, he began his career in public service as a shelter manager for the Emergency Management office of the Municipality of Peñuelas. Since 1996 has worked as a Puerto Rico Natural Resources Ranger Corps, attached to the Puerto Rico Department of Natural and Environmental Resources.

Political career
Served as a member of the city council in Peñuelas, Puerto Rico since 2000 and was elected again in 2004. In 2012 ran for mayor of Peñuelas but lost. He was elected as senator to represent the District of Ponce in the 2016 elections. His most known bill is the Senate Project 1050, which simplifies the process of gaining a firearm licence. In 2020, Cruz Santiago along with 5 others were referred to the Puerto Rico Office of the Special Independent Prosecutor's Panel by Dennise Longo Quiñones and he decried it as political persecution.

References

1975 births
Members of the Senate of Puerto Rico
New Progressive Party (Puerto Rico) politicians
Living people